This is a list of DEEP champions at each weight class. DEEP is a Japan-based mixed martial arts (MMA) promoting and sanctioning organization.

Current Champions

Men

Women

Men's Championship History

Megatonweight Championship 
Weight limit: Unlimited

Heavyweight Championship 
Weight limit: 93 kg (205 lb)

Middleweight Championship 
Weight limit: 84 kg (185.2 lb)

Welterweight Championship 
Weight limit: 77 kg (169.7 lb)

Lightweight Championship 
Weight limit: 70 kg (154.3 lb)

Featherweight Championship 
Weight limit: 65 kg (143.3 lb)

Bantamweight Championship 
Weight limit: 60 kg (132.3 lb)

Flyweight Championship 
Weight limit: 56 kg (123.4 lb)

Strawweight Championship 
Weight limit: 52 kg (114.6 lb)

Women's Championship History

Openweight Championship

Lightweight Championship 
Weight limit: 48 kg (105.8 lb)

Microweight Championship 
Weight limit: 45 kg (99.2 lb)

Footnotes

See also
List of current mixed martial arts champions
List of Deep events
List of Jewels events
List of Jewels champions
List of Pancrase champions
List of Pride champions
List of Road FC champions
List of Strikeforce champions
List of UFC champions
List of WEC champions
Mixed martial arts weight classes

References

External links
DEEP current champions

Deep champions